NBC 7 may refer to one of the following television stations within the United States:

Current affiliates
KMNF-LD in Mankato, Minnesota
KNSD in San Diego, California (cable channel; broadcasts on channel 39 [O&O])
KPLC in Lake Charles, Louisiana
KQCD-TV in Dickinson, North Dakota
KTVB in Boise, Idaho
KWWL (TV) in Waterloo, Iowa
WDAM-TV in Laurel/Hattiesburg, Mississippi
WITN in Washington / Greenville / Jacksonville / New Bern, North Carolina
WJHG-TV in Panama City, Florida

Formerly affiliated
KAII-TV in Wailuku, Hawaii (1958 to 1996)
Satellite of KHON-TV in Honolulu
KJCW in Sheridan, Wyoming (2002 to 2009)
KOAM-TV in Pittsburg, Kansas (1953 to 1982)
KRCR-TV in Redding, California (1956 to 1978)
WHDH in Boston, Massachusetts (1995 to 2016)
WSVN in Miami, Florida (1956 to 1989)